Boris Lalović (born August 4, 1981) is a Montenegrin former professional basketball player.

External links
  at eurobasket.com
  at realgm.com

1981 births
Living people
Basketball League of Serbia players
CS Universitatea Cluj-Napoca (men's basketball) players
CSU Sibiu players
KK Hemofarm players
KK Sutjeska players
Montenegrin expatriate basketball people in Romania
Montenegrin expatriate basketball people in Serbia
Montenegrin men's basketball players
Power forwards (basketball)
Sportspeople from Nikšić